Below is a list of shooting ranges in Akershus county municipality for bow, crossbow, shotgun, pistol and rifle.

See also 
 Shooting ranges in Norway
 Shooting sport

References

External links 
 Map over shooting ranges affiliated with National Rifle Association of Norway
 Map over shooting ranges affiliated with Dynamic Sports Shooting Norway
 Map over shooting ranges affiliated with Norwegian Association of Hunters and Anglers
 The book "Skytebane-guiden" (The Shooting Range Guide) by Svend Åge Sæther and Øystein Antonsen, 1997, Sæther & Antonsen, .

Akershus
Society of Norway
Akershus ranges